Yellow Banks, Kentucky, was the name of the rustic community founded by pioneer William Smeathers or Smothers around 1790 on the banks of the Ohio River.  The name was derived from the yellowish banks along the river. In 1817, Yellow Banks became the established town of Owensborough, in honor of Col. Abraham Owen (also the namesake of Owen County in Kentucky).

References

Unincorporated communities in Daviess County, Kentucky
Unincorporated communities in Kentucky
Populated places established in 1797
Owensboro metropolitan area